Tomolamia is a genus of longhorn beetles of the subfamily Lamiinae, containing the following species:

 Tomolamia irrorata Lameere, 1893
 Tomolamia unicoloripennis Breuning, 1977

References

Lamiini